Llyn Bedydd  is a small lake in Wrexham County Borough, in northeastern Wales, near the border with England. The lake and the surrounding woodland are designated as a Site of Special Scientific Interest.

Description
Llyn Bedydd means the "lake of Beda", the identity of Beda is however not known.

Flora and fauna
The wet carr around the Llyn Bedydd is notable for purple small reed and alder buckthorn which are very rare in Clwyd; tufted sedge and bay willow which are uncommon in Clwyd; and the nationally scarce cowbane. The thin fringing strip of fen supports other interesting plants, especially sedges. The fen creates a tussocky species rich floating mat  at the southern end of the lake while on the land in the southeastern corner of the SSSI there is a small area of fen pasture which grades into a bog. Llyn Beddyd is relatively shallow but it has steeply shelving banks  which are shaded by the woodlands and these restrict the development of stands of emergent and marginal vegetation.

Llyn Bedydd is supports a rich invertebrate fauna, species recorded include the nationally scarce variable damselfly and the local red-eyed damselfly.
Llyn Bedydd contains common bream, common rudd, common carp, European perch, tench and common roach. The fishing is run by Warners Fishing Club.

Archaeology
In 1877 a logboat was found in the Llyn Bedydd.

References

See also
List of Sites of Special Scientific Interest in Clwyd

Sites of Special Scientific Interest in Clwyd
Lakes of Wales
Bodies of water of Wrexham County Borough